Brachychilus wagenknechti is a species of beetle in the family Cerambycidae. It was described by Cerda in 1954. It is known from Chile.

References

Phacellini
Beetles described in 1954
Beetles of South America
Endemic fauna of Chile
Arthropods of Chile